Canada (IOC country code CAN) has competed at every Winter Olympic Games, and has won at least one medal each time. By total medals, the country's best performance was in the 2018 Winter Olympic Games where Canadian athletes won 29 medals. Canada set a new record for most gold medals won by a country in a single Winter Olympics with 14 at the 2010 Winter Olympics in Vancouver, Canada.  This achievement surpassed the previous record of 13 gold medals held by the Soviet Union (1976) and Norway (2002). Both Germany and Norway matched the record total of 14 gold medals in Pyeongchang in 2018. This record has since been surpassed by Norway with 16 at the 2022 Winter Olympics.

Canada has hosted the winter games twice: in Calgary in 1988, and in Vancouver in 2010. Canada has also hosted the Summer Olympic Games once, in 1976 in Montreal.

Medal tables

Medals by year

Medals by sport

*One of Canada's ice hockey gold medals was won during the 1920 Summer Olympics. This table includes this medal, resulting in the discrepancy between the medals by games and medals by sports tables.

Canada has never won an Olympic medal in the following current winter sport: Nordic combined.

 Canada has finished with the highest Canadian Winter medals total at the 2018 Winter Olympic Games with 29 medals. This represents Canada's second highest medal haul at the Olympics, behind the 44 of the Soviet-bloc-boycotted 1984 Summer Games.
 Canada has finished the 2010 Winter Olympics at the first place at the medal table, with 14 gold medals.
 Canada was the first nation to win 14 gold medals at a single Winter Games. In 2018, Germany and Norway matched this record.  Then in 2022 Norway set a new record with 16

Olympians
 The Canadian with the most times at the Winter Olympics is Jasey-Jay Anderson, who appeared at 6 Olympics; 1998, 2002, 2006, 2010, 2014, 2018.
 The Canadian with the most Winter medals is Cindy Klassen, who has 6 medals; 1 gold, 3 silver, 2 bronze. While Canadian Winter Olympian Clara Hughes also has 6, her medals are split across Winter (4 medals) and Summer (2 medals) Games.
 The Canadian with the most medals at a single Winter Games is Cindy Klassen, who won 5 at the 2006 Games.

Biathlon

Canada's only medals in biathlon were won by Myriam Bedard in the Albertville and Lillehammer games.

Bobsleigh

Bobsleigh

Canada has won five gold medals in bobsleigh. The first, a surprising victory by Vic Emery's four-man team in Innsbruck (1964). The second was won by Pierre Lueders and Dave MacEachern in the two-man event in Nagano (1998) - a race that produced a rare tie in which both the Canadian pair and an Italian pair were awarded gold (a German pair won bronze). The Canadian men's duo of Justin Kripps and Alex Kovacz would repeat the feat in 2018, tying for gold with a German sled. In the first back to back wins by a two-woman team, Kaillie Humphries and Heather Moyse won gold medals in Vancouver (2010) and Sochi (2014).

Skeleton

In the 2006 Turin games Mellisa Hollingsworth-Richards won Canada's first medal in skeleton and later Duff Gibson became the first Canadian to win a gold medal in skeleton in the men's event. At the 2010 Vancouver games, Jon Montgomery won a gold in the men's event.

Curling

Curling is one of the most popular sports in Canada, and both the men's and women's teams have won a medal at each of the five Olympics curling has been held at so far. Canadian curlers also finished in the top 3 places when curling was a demonstration sport in 1988 and 1992. The women's team in 1998, led by skip Sandra Schmirler, the men's team in 2006, led by skip Brad Gushue, the men's team in 2010, led by Kevin Martin, the women's team in 2014 led by Jennifer Jones and the men's team in 2014 led by Brad Jacobs have won gold medals. In 2018, Kaitlyn Lawes and John Morris won gold in the first mixed doubles tournament at a Winter Olympics.

Ice hockey

Hockey is Canada's national winter sport, and Canadians are extremely passionate about the game. The nation has traditionally done very well at the Olympic games, winning 6 of the first 7 gold medals. However, by 1956 its amateur club teams and national teams could not compete with the teams of government-supported players from the Soviet Union. When Canada's best players (from the National Hockey League) were able to compete starting in 1998, expectations were high for the country's return to glory, but the Czech Republic won gold and the team fell to Finland in the bronze medal game. Canada finally won its first hockey gold in 50 years in Salt Lake City in 2002, sparking national celebrations.  

The 2010 games were the first Olympics to take place in an NHL market since the league's players started to compete in the games, as Vancouver is home to the Vancouver Canucks.

Women's ice hockey was introduced at the Nagano Olympics in 1998, with Canada winning the silver medal. Canada has appeared in every Olympic gold medal game, facing the United States six times (1998, 2002, 2010, 2014, 2018, 2022) and Sweden once (2006). Canada has topped the podium five times (2002, 2006, 2010, 2014, 2022), taking silver against the United States twice (1998, 2018).

Note: Ice hockey was part of the Summer Olympic program for the 1920 games in Antwerp, but is listed here for completeness. As it was held at a Summer Games, it is not counted in the total for Canada's performance at the Winter games.

Luge

Following the announcement on December 22, 2017 that the 2014 luge team relay results of the silver medallists Russian team were voided due to team members being banned for doping violations, Canada was expected to be upgraded from fourth to bronze. However, the bans and annulment of results were successfully appealed at the Court of Arbitration for Sport, and on 1 February 2018 the results were restored. The IOC intended to appeal the decision to the Federal Supreme Court of Switzerland, however following the Court's upholding of the CAS' decision in the related case of Alexander Legkov, the IOC decided not to proceed with the appeal.

Alex Gough won Canada's first ever Olympic medal (Bronze) in Luge at the 2018 Winter Olympics in Pyeongchang.

Skating

Figure skating

Canada has won at least one medal in figure skating in 14 of the 17 post-war Winter Olympic games (since 1948). Canada's gold medalists are Barbara Ann Scott (1948) and the pairs of Barbara Wagner and Robert Paul (1960); Jamie Salé and David Pelletier (2002); and Tessa Virtue and Scott Moir (2010 and 2018). Canada also won gold in the team event at the 2018 Winter Olympics in Pyeongchang. Virtue and Moir celebrated a number of firsts at the Vancouver 2010 Winter Olympics when they won the gold medal for Ice Dancing: their first gold medal at their first Olympics, and the first North Americans as well as the youngest pair to win gold in this event.  Other notable Canadian skaters include 1976 Bronze medalist Toller Cranston, as well as Brian Orser and Elvis Stojko, both of whom won silver medals in successive games.

Short track speed skating

Canada has benefitted from the addition of short track speed skating to the Olympic program in 1992, winning multiple medals at each games since. Marc Gagnon, who won 3 gold and 2 bronze medals between 1994 and 2002 and François-Louis Tremblay, who has collected 2 gold, 2 silver and 1 bronze medals from 2002 to 2010, are among only 5 Canadian Olympians to win a total of 5 medals.

Speed skating

Gaetan Boucher (1000 m and 1500 m in 1984), Catriona Le May Doan (500 m in 1998 and 2002), Cindy Klassen (1500 m in 2006), Clara Hughes (5000 m in 2006), Christine Nesbitt (1000 m in 2010) and Ted-Jan Bloemen (10000 m in 2018) are Canada's gold medalists in speed skating. In 2006, Cindy Klassen became the first Canadian to ever win five medals in one winter games, winning one gold (1500 m), two silver (Team Pursuit and 1000 m) and two bronze medals (3000 m and 5000 m). She also won a bronze medal in the 2002 games, giving her 6 medals, surpassing short track speed skater Marc Gagnon for the title of most decorated Canadian Winter Olympian. However, Clara Hughes was able to tie Klassen's record following her bronze medal in 2010. In addition to this, Hughes won 2 bronze medals at the 1996 Summer Olympics, one in 2002 Winter Olympics (making her the first Canadian to have won a medal in both the Summer and Winter Olympics), and two in 2006.

Skiing

Alpine skiing

Canada's most celebrated alpine skier is Nancy Greene, who won gold and silver at the 1968 games in Grenoble.

Cross country skiing

Canada's first medal in cross country skiing was the gold won by Beckie Scott in Salt Lake City (2002), the first time a North American woman won any Olympic medal in this sport. Chandra Crawford followed this up at the next games with a gold medal in the sprint event, and the team of Scott and Sara Renner also won a silver medal in Turin (2006).

Freestyle skiing

Canada has enjoyed success in freestyle skiing after its introduction to the Winter Olympics in 1992. Jean-Luc Brassard (1994), Jennifer Heil (2006), Alexandre Bilodeau (2010 & 2014), Justine Dufour-Lapointe (2014), and Mikael Kingsbury (2018) have won gold in the moguls event. Canada has won gold in the women's ski cross at every olympics that featured it (Ashleigh McIvor, 2010; Marielle Thompson, 2014; and Kelsey Serwa, 2018). Brady Leman (2018) won gold in the men's ski cross event. In 2014 and 2018 the Canadian women also took the silver medals (Serwa in 2014, and Brittany Phelan in 2018). Dara Howell took gold in the slopestyle event in 2014. Cassie Sharpe added a halfpipe gold in 2018.

Canadian skiers also finished in the top 3 positions in aerials at the 1988 and 1992 games, when it was a demonstration sport.

Nordic combined

Canada has never won an Olympic medal in the Nordic combined competition. Their best finish was tenth in the individual normal hill competition at the 1932 games.

Ski jumping

Canada won the bronze medal in the mixed team ski jumping event at the 2022 Winter Olympics.

Snowboarding

Ross Rebagliati won a gold medal in snowboarding when the sport made its Olympic debut at the 1998 Nagano games. Initially he was stripped of the medal when traces of marijuana were found in his blood during a drug test, but the IOC reversed its decision after an appeal a few days later because marijuana was only a restricted substance, not a banned substance.

See also

 Canada at the Summer Olympics
 Own the Podium - Canada's government-sponsored program to win more medals

References

External links
 
 
 
 CBC Digital Archives - Gold Medal Athletes - 1948-1968
 CBC Digital Archives - Cold Gold: Canada's Winter Winners 1984–2002

 
Olympics